Color as a Way of Life is an album by jazz saxophonist Lou Donaldson, his second recorded for the Cotillion label, featuring Donaldson with an orchestra arranged by Mike Goldberg and Dennis Williams.

The album was awarded 2 stars in an Allmusic review.

Track listing 
All compositions by Lou Donaldson except as indicated
 "Too Much to Explain" (Al Broomfield) - 4:13  
 "Love for Sale" (Cole Porter) - 5:04  
 "Piece of Your World" (Broomfield) - 4:32  
 "Passion Fruit" (Donaldson, Johnny Brantley, Rick Willard) - 4:03  
 "Comin' Thru the Back Door" (Broomfield) - 3:42  
 "Ebb Tide" (Robert Maxwell, Carl Sigman) - 5:18  
 "Maker's Dream" - 4:53  
 "Walkin' Sally" - 4:46  
 Recorded at Groove Sound Studios, NYC, December, 1976.

Personnel 
 Lou Donaldson - alto saxophone
 Paul G. Bogosian, Ernie Royal - trumpet, flugelhorn
 John Drew Kelly - trombone, bass trombone
 Seldon Powell - flute, baritone saxophone
 Irving Spice - lead violin
 Louis Haber, Elliott Rosoff, David Sackson, Louis Stone - violin
 William Phipps - electric piano, clavinet
 A.C. Drummer Jr. - guitar
 Jacob Hunter - electric bass
 Jimmy Young - drums
 Jacqueline Copeland - vocals
 Mike Goldberg - arranger, conductor 
 Dennis Williams - horn and string arranger

References 

Lou Donaldson albums
1977 albums
Cotillion Records albums